Swami Nityaswarupananda (1899–1992) was a monk of Sri Ramakrishna Math. Swami Nityaswarupananda has translated Ashtavakara Gita into English. His biography has been written by Dr. Shelly Brown. He established the Ramakrishna Mission Institute of Culture in Kolkata in 1938.

Notes

External links
Astavakra Samhita - Swami Nityaswarupananda 
Centred in Truth - Dr. Shelly Brown
The Ramakrishna Mission Institute of Culture
India's Message to the World - Swami Nityaswarupananda
The World Civilization Centre - Swami Nityaswarupananda

Indian Hindu monks
Monks of the Ramakrishna Mission
1899 births
1992 deaths